Grant McPherson (born c. 1964 or 1965)  is a Scottish curler.

At the national level, he is a one-time Scottish men's champion, winning a national title in 1987. He represented Scotland at the 1987 World Men's Curling Championship, but was banned from representing Scotland at the 1987 European Curling Championships due to a disciplinary infraction.

At the time of the 1988 Scottish Championship, he worked as a draughtsman in Ayrshire. He is a left-handed curler.

Teams

References

External links
 

Living people
Scottish male curlers
Scottish curling champions
1960s births